Lekana is a city and seat of Lekana District in the Plateaux Region of northeastern Republic of the Congo.

The city is served by Lekana Airport.

Plateaux Department (Republic of the Congo)
Populated places in the Republic of the Congo